Monardella villosa is a plant in the mint family which is known by the common name coyote mint.

This is a perennial wildflower found only in California, except for one subspecies which sometimes occurs in Oregon. It grows in habitats of the California chaparral and woodlands in the California Coast Ranges and Sierra Nevada foothills.

Description
Monardella villosa forms a small bush or matted groundcover tangle of hairy mint-scented foliage. It produces rounded inflorescences of small, thready, bright lavender or pink flowers. It is a perennial subshrub and flowers from May to August.

Subspecies
Subspecies include:
 Monardella villosa ssp. franciscana
 Monardella villosa ssp. obispoensis
 Monardella villosa ssp. villosa

Uses
The flowers are attractive to butterflies, with the nectar providing a food source for them.

This plant was used by the indigenous peoples of California as a remedy for stomach upset, respiratory conditions, and sore throat. It may also be steeped into a bitter mint tea.

Cultivation
Monardella villosa is cultivated in by specialty plant nurseries and available as an ornamental plant for native plant, drought tolerant, natural landscape, and habitat gardens; and for ecological restoration projects.

References

External links

 Calflora Database: Monardella villosa (Coyote mint)
 Jepson Manual eFlora (TJM2) treatment of Monardella villosa
 USDA Plants Profile for Monardella villosa (coyote mint)
 University of Michigan: Ethnobotany of Monardella villosa
 UC Photos gallery — Monardella villosa

villosa
Flora of California
Flora of Oregon
Flora of the Sierra Nevada (United States)
Natural history of the California chaparral and woodlands
Natural history of the California Coast Ranges
Natural history of the San Francisco Bay Area
Plants used in traditional Native American medicine
Garden plants of North America
Butterfly food plants
Drought-tolerant plants
Groundcovers
Flora without expected TNC conservation status